Orenburg State University (Orenburgskiy gosudárstvennyy universitét), previously known as Orenburg Polytechnic Institute (OGU), is a university in Russia.

History 
The university was founded in 1955 as a branch of Kuibyshev Polytechnic Institute.

In 1971, it converted into Orenburg Polytechnic Institute. In 1994, it became Orenburg State Technical University. In 1996, converted into Orenburg State University.

Orenburg State University is the largest institute of higher education in the Orenburg region. It is a leading training, research and cultural center carrying out advanced educational services at all levels.

In 2014, Orenburg State Institute of Management integrated with Orenburg State University.

Staff and students
The university employs more than 1,200 academics and 1,800 support staff. More than 40,000 undergraduates and 3,000 advanced degree candidates are enrolled. More than 5,000 specialists participate in refresher courses for career enhancement.

Campus

The university's main campus is composed of four education buildings, a dining hall, a health-improving and physical training gym with sport grounds, a library, students’ polyclinic and the Chapel of Saint Martyr Tatiana.
The OSU campus also includes:
Dormitories
Medical Prophylactics Center
Students’ Center
The Palace of Culture "Russia"
The Palace of Youth Creativity "Progress"
OSU Museum
Geologic Museum

Institutions and research centres 
Institute of Bioelements is the satellite centre to Trace Element — Institute for UNESCO in Russia 
Institute of Micro and Nanotechnology
Laboratory electronic media for educational purposes
Small Academy of Public Administration
Interdepartmental laboratory of geographic information technologies
Interdisciplinary Regional Centre of Training and Retraining
Meteorological Training Station
Research Institute of History and Ethnography of the Southern Urals
Research Institute of Regional Economy
Research Centre for monitoring of buildings and structures
Research and Education Center of Biochemical Physics of Nanosystems

and several others

Rectors
 Aleksander Burba (1971-1983) 
 Ramses Abdrashitov (1983-1987) 
 Anatoly Kozachenko  (1987-1989) 
 Victor Bondarenko (1989-2006) 
 Vladimir Kovalevsky (2006-2015)
 Zhanna Ermakova (2015-2020)
 Sergey Miroshnikov (acting rector since 2020)

Alumni 
Vladimir Elagin, governor of Orenburg Oblast (1991–1999)
Nikolay Grigoryev, rector of The Moscow State Technological University
Yuriy Berg, governor of Orenburg Oblast 2010-2019
Denis Pasler, governor of Orenburg Oblast (since 2019)

Notes and references

External links 
 Orenburg  State University

International cooperation 
The University has many connections with foreign universities in Germany, Japan, Portugal, Finland and some other countries.

OSU has a Japanese Information Center, opened in 2006. The main goal of the Japanese Center is to develop economic, scientific, and cultural ties between Russia and Japan at the regional level, popularize all aspects of cooperation in the business environment, the university community, and the general public. Japanese language courses are organized on the basis of the Japanese Information Center.

In addition, the university has centers for English, Chinese, German, French and Slavic languages.

Students with excellent academic performance have the opportunity to participate in a student exchange program and study in Japan, Germany and Finland.

Universities in Volga Region
Universities and institutes established in the Soviet Union
1955 establishments in Russia
Buildings and structures in Orenburg